Srebotje is a small settlement in the Slovene Hills south of Selnica ob Muri in the Municipality of Šentilj in northeastern Slovenia.

References

External links
Srebotje on Geopedia

Populated places in the Municipality of Šentilj